Live + Cuddly is a live album by Canadian punk rock band Nomeansno. Released in 1991, it   featured live recordings from European performances in support of the band's album Wrong (1989). Live + Cuddly has been praised as one of the best punk rock live albums ever recorded. The cover photo features band members John and Rob Wright as children, alongside their father.

Track listing
 "It's Catching Up" – 4:09
 "Two Lips, Two Lungs And One Tongue" – 3:07
 "Rags and Bones" – 5:18
 "Body Bag" – 6:40
 "Brother Rat" – 2:11
 "What Slayde Says" – 8:44
 "Some Bodies" – 4:39
 "Teresa, Give Me That Knife" – 2:19
 "Victory" – 7:45
 "Dark Ages" – 5:30
 "The End Of All Things" – 5:50
 "The Day Everything Became Nothing" – 5:28
 "Dead Souls" – 1:50
 "Metronome" – 7:34
 "No Fucking" – 1:42

Personnel
Andy Kerr – Guitar, Bass, Vocals
John Wright – Vocals, Drums, Keyboards, Percussion
Rob Wright – Vocals, Guitar, Bass, Artwork
Craig Bougie – Live Sound
Dolf Planteydt – Mixing, Engineering
John Yates – Artwork

References

Nomeansno albums
1991 live albums
Alternative Tentacles live albums